The women's 800 metres event at the 2005 Asian Athletics Championships was held in Incheon, South Korea on September 3–4.

Medalists

Results

Heats

Final

Note: Santhi Soundarajan originally finished second with 2:04.01 but was later disqualified after failing a gender verification test.

References
Results

2005 Asian Athletics Championships
800 metres at the Asian Athletics Championships
2005 in women's athletics